Dirt Merchant is an independent comedy film that premiered on SightSound.com on September 19, 1999, and premiered on DVD on June 11, 2002. The film was written and directed by B.J. Nelson, and stars Danny Masterson and Julie Benz. It is notable for adult film actress Jenna Jameson's first mainstream appearance. It was filmed in Los Angeles, California, and originally titled My Name is Dirt.

Plot
Dirt Merchant is a young man who struggles finding a job after getting fired from the mailroom at a record company where he dreamed of becoming assistant director. Eventually he becomes a summons server but gets in trouble when a rock star overdoses and he is framed for murdering him. He has to solve the case and deal with his feelings for his ex-girlfriend Angie while also dealing with the rock star's porn star girlfriend Holly So Tightly.

Cast
 Danny Masterson as Dirt Merchant
 Julie Benz as Angie
 Jenna Jameson as Holly 'So Tightly'
 David DeLuise as Sly
 David Faustino as 'Sponge'
 Anthony Michael Hall as Jeffry Alan Spacy
 Brion James as Detective Harry Ball
 Tim Thomerson as Jack
 Lee Arenberg as James Earl
 Carlos Alazraqui as Ronny Orlando
 David "Shark" Fralick as Sergeant Sampson
 Lisa Kushell as XTV Reporter 
 Elon Gold as Blood Banker
 Kirsten Holmquist as Receptionist
 Simon Brook as Rock Star
 Wade Carpenter as Johnny Decay
 Suzanne DeLaurentis as Jake's Secretary
 Anne Getty as Poetry Girl
 Nicholle Ginette as Janelle
 Dale Godboldo as Zeke, The Greek
 Dawn Heusser as Karate Nurse
 Tommy Hinkley as Mort Huskins
 Sidney Liufau as 'El Nino'
 Vanessa Rooke as Hemp Girl
 Clifford E. Wright as The Masked Maniac

References

External links
  
 
 
 FilmHead review
 New York Times Review

1999 films
Internet films
1999 comedy films
American independent films
American comedy films
1990s English-language films
1990s American films
1999 independent films